Alfred Mallwitz (2 October 1919, Berlin – 17 March 1986, Vaterstetten) was a German architect. From 1953 he was architect to the German Archaeological Institute excavations at Olympia, leading them from 1972 to 1984. From 1978 to 1980 he also led major excavations south-east of Olympia.

1919 births
1986 deaths
20th-century German architects
20th-century archaeologists
Archaeologists from Berlin
German classical scholars
Architects from Berlin